The Jacquet River station is a flag stop Via Rail station in the community of Jacquet River, New Brunswick, Canada. Jacquet River is served by Via Rail's Montreal-Halifax train, the Ocean.

The station was demolished, along with nearby Charlo station in October, 2021.

References

External links

 Via Rail page for the Ocean

Via Rail stations in New Brunswick
Rail transport in Restigouche County, New Brunswick
Buildings and structures in Restigouche County, New Brunswick